Emma (stylized as Emma.) is a 2020 period romantic comedy film directed by Autumn de Wilde (in her feature directorial debut), from a screenplay by Eleanor Catton, based on Jane Austen's 1815 novel of the same name. It stars Anya Taylor-Joy as Miss Emma Woodhouse, a wealthy and elegant young woman living with her father in Regency-era England who amuses herself with matchmaking and meddles in the romantic lives of those closest to her. The film also stars Johnny Flynn, Josh O'Connor, Callum Turner, Mia Goth, Miranda Hart, and Bill Nighy.

Produced by Perfect World Pictures, Working Title Films and Blueprint Pictures, a film adaptation of Austen's novel by Focus Features began development in October 2018 when Taylor-Joy was cast in the title role, with de Wilde attached as the director. The remainder of the supporting roles were cast by March 2019. Principal photography took place between March and June 2019 across England.

Emma was released in the United Kingdom on 14 February 2020, and in the United States on 21 February 2020 by Universal Pictures. It received generally favourable reviews, with the performances and production design singled out for praise. It grossed $26.5 million worldwide against its budget of $10 million. The film received two Academy Award nominations for Best Costume Design and Best Makeup and Hairstyling at the 93rd Academy Awards, as well as a Best Costume Design nomination at the 74th British Academy Film Awards, three nominations at the 26th Critics' Choice Awards, and a Golden Globe Award for Best Actress – Motion Picture Comedy or Musical nomination (for Taylor-Joy) at the 78th Golden Globe Awards.

Plot 
In Regency-era England, wealthy and beautiful Emma Woodhouse lives with her father and is often visited by Mr Knightley, a local landowner who is the brother of her sister's husband. She searches for a new companion after her governess, Miss Taylor, marries and becomes Mrs. Weston. Emma settles on Harriet Smith, a younger girl who Emma supposes is the unclaimed child of a gentleman; Harriet's parents are unknown, but her education has been provided for. Emma learns that Mr. Robert Martin, a tenant farmer of Mr. Knightley, has proposed to Harriet. Though claiming she will not interfere, Emma manipulates Harriet into declining Mr. Martin's offer of marriage, much to Harriet's distress. Emma believes that Mr. Elton, the local vicar, is in love with Harriet and encourages Harriet to transfer her hopes to him, despite Mr. Knightley's warning that she should not involve herself in the situation.

At Christmas time, Emma's older sister and Mr. Knightley's younger brother come to visit. After everyone leaves dinner with the Westons early, Emma finds herself alone in a carriage with Mr. Elton, who declares his love for her. Emma promptly refuses him, and Mr. Elton disappears for six weeks, eventually returning with a wife. Two much-talked-about relations of Highbury residents appear: Jane Fairfax, the niece of Miss Bates, and Frank Churchill, Mr. Weston's son from his first marriage. Emma grows jealous of Jane but is entranced by Frank.

Frank's arrival prompts the Westons to hold a ball, where Mr. Elton embarrasses Harriet by pointedly refusing to dance with her. She is rescued by Mr. Knightley, who asks her to dance. Emma and Mr. Knightley also dance together, awakening romantic feelings between them. Though Emma leaves before Mr. Knightley can speak to her, he runs to her home only for their meeting to be interrupted by Frank, who has rescued Harriet after being set upon by Romanichal Travellers. Harriet intimates to Emma that she has fallen in love again, leading Emma to believe Harriet is in love with Frank. Emma again vows not to interfere but manipulates circumstances so that Harriet and Frank may spend more time together.

Emma tries to spend more time with Mr. Knightley and is surprised when he repeatedly ignores her. On a picnic with their entire party of social acquaintances, Frank urges them to play a game to amuse Emma, who unthinkingly insults Miss Bates, leading the party to disband in discomfort. Mr. Knightley rebukes Emma for her behaviour, and a humiliated Emma apologizes to Miss Bates, who accepts her apology without question.

Frank Churchill's wealthy aunt dies, and he is no longer required to be at her beck and call. The Westons reveal he was secretly engaged to Jane Fairfax and waiting for his aunt, who opposed the match, to die. The Westons had hoped he would marry Emma, but Emma is only distressed on account of Harriet. Emma breaks the news to Harriet, who reveals that she is actually in love with Mr. Knightley. Harriet realizes that Emma herself is in love with Mr. Knightley.

Mr. Knightley goes to Emma to comfort her about the news of Frank and Jane being engaged, and reveals that he is in love with her and hopes to marry her. Initially pleased with his marriage offer, Emma develops a nosebleed when she realizes how upset Harriet will be, and she runs off leaving behind a very confused but hopeful Mr. Knightley. She goes to Mr. Martin to make amends, offering him a portrait of Harriet she drew herself. Harriet tells Emma she has accepted Mr. Martin's offer of marriage and that her father has revealed himself now that she is of age; he is not a gentleman, but a tradesman who makes galoshes. Emma congratulates Harriet and invites her and her father to her home once he is in Highbury.

Though Emma and Mr. Knightley are very much in love, Emma is distressed at the thought of leaving her father alone. To accommodate her wishes, Mr. Knightley suggests that he join them at Hartfield rather than have Emma quit her father's home. Emma happily agrees, and the two are married.

Cast

Production 
In October 2018, Anya Taylor-Joy was cast in the lead role, and Autumn de Wilde was signed for her directorial debut. In December 2018, Johnny Flynn joined the cast.

In March 2019, Bill Nighy, Mia Goth, Josh O'Connor, Callum Turner, Miranda Hart, Rupert Graves, Gemma Whelan, Amber Anderson and Tanya Reynolds joined the cast, and Alexandra Byrne signed as costume designer. Principal photography began on 18 March 2019, was scheduled to conclude on 24 May, but eventually wrapped on 6 June 2019.

Firle Place in Sussex was used for the exterior of Emma's home. Other locations included Lower Slaughter (exteriors) in the Cotswolds standing in for the village of Highbury, Kingston Bagpuize House in Oxfordshire, Wilton House near Salisbury in Wiltshire, and Chavenage House at Beverston, Gloucestershire.

Director de Wilde decided the film's title should include a period (full stop) to signify its being a period piece.

Music 

In the film, Jane Fairfax (played by Amber Anderson) outshines Emma by performing the third movement from Mozart's Piano Sonata No. 12 on the fortepiano. A trained pianist, Anderson had to relearn the piece to adapt her technique to the period instrument's shorter keys.

The credit sequence features "Queen Bee", an original song by Johnny Flynn. Isobel Waller-Bridge asked Flynn to write a song for the film. He wrote "Queen Bee" to convey Knightley's perspective on Emma, and performed it in a style appropriate for the film's period.

The soundtrack features many a cappella recordings of folk songs by artists like Maddy Prior and the Watersons. De Wilde had an immediate conception of the film's music being rooted in folk music. She also wanted the orchestral score to emulate Sergei Prokofiev's Peter and the Wolf, where each character had a theme that personified them.

Anya Taylor-Joy, Anderson and Flynn all sing onscreen in the film. Taylor-Joy took pains to explain that her performance of "The Last Rose of Summer" used an affected style that she imagined Emma Woodhouse would use to charm her audience.

Anderson and Flynn sing a duet of 'Drink to me Only With Thine Eyes' written by Ben Jonson in the film during a ball scene.

The adagio from the final movement of Haydn's Symphony No. 45 in F sharp minor, "Farewell", is also heard in the film.

Release 
Emma was released in the United Kingdom on 14 February 2020, coinciding with Valentine's Day, and in the United States on 21 February.

It was released digitally in March 2020 in the United States, Canada and the UK through Premium VOD on streaming platforms, due to movie theatre closures during the COVID-19 pandemic. It was released on DVD and Blu-ray on 19 May.

Reception

Box office 
Emma grossed $10.1 million in the United States and Canada, and $15.4 million in other territories, for a worldwide total of $26.5 million.

In North America, it made $230,000 from five theaters in its opening weekend, for a per-venue average of $46,000, the highest of 2020 at that point. It went wide two weeks later, grossing $5 million from 1,565 theaters and finishing sixth at the box office. Its time at the box office was then interrupted by the COVID-19 pandemic closing theaters.

In Spain, it has grossed €228,000 ($285,000).

Critical response 
On Rotten Tomatoes, the film holds an approval rating of 86% based on 257 reviews, with an average of 7.3/10. The website's critics consensus reads: "Other adaptations may do a better job of consistently capturing the spirit of the classic source material, but Jane Austen fans should still find a solid match in this Emma." On Metacritic, the film was assigned a weighted average score of 71 out of 100, based on 48 critics, indicating "generally favorable reviews." Audiences polled by CinemaScore gave the film an average grade of "B" on an A+ to F scale, and PostTrak reported it received an average 3 out of 5 stars, with 44% of people they surveyed saying they would definitely recommend it.

In a mostly favorable review written for Variety, Andrew Barker referred to the film as a "an entirely worthy companion" to other adaptations of the novel, though noted it was "hardly a definitive take".

Accolades

References

External links 
 
 
 
 
 

2020 films
2020 directorial debut films
2020 romantic comedy-drama films
2020s American films
2020s British films
2020s English-language films
2020s historical comedy-drama films
American historical comedy-drama films
American historical romance films
American romantic comedy-drama films
British historical comedy-drama films
British historical romance films
British romantic comedy-drama films
Films based on Emma (novel)
Films directed by Autumn de Wilde
Films produced by Eric Fellner
Films produced by Tim Bevan
Films set in the 1800s
Films set in England
Films shot in East Sussex
Perfect World Pictures films
Working Title Films films